Carter Ledyard & Milburn LLP is a New York City law firm. 

The firm was founded in 1854 by Henry Scudder and James C. Carter.

Former partners 

 Grenville Clark, a member of the Harvard Corporation, co-author of the book World Peace Through World Law, and nominee for Nobel Peace Prize
 William Harding Jackson, National Security Advisor (under Eisenhower) and Deputy Director of CIA (under Truman).
 President Franklin D. Roosevelt was once an associate.
 Frank Wisner, a head of Office of Strategic Services operations in southeastern Europe at the end of World War II. 
 Margo Kitsy Brodie, a judge of the United States District Court for the Eastern District of New York.

References 

Law firms established in 1854
1854 establishments in New York (state)
Law firms based in New York City